Osney Bridge is a road bridge across the River Thames in Oxford, England, built in 1888 to replace a stone bridge which collapsed in 1885. It carries the Botley Road (A420) from Botley into Oxford. The Thames Path crosses the river on this bridge, just above Osney Lock.

The original bridge was probably built by the monks of Osney Abbey, to carry the main road across the millstream of Osney Mill west of the island then known as Osney. By the early 17th century it was a three-arch stone construction. In 1790 the millstream became the main navigation channel of the river, and the bridge had become a serious obstruction to navigation by the mid 19th century. In 1885 the central arch collapsed, leaving massive piers.

Proposals to raise Osney Bridge 
Osney Bridge has the lowest headroom (less than 7 feet 6 inches, or 2.3 metres) of any bridge across the navigable Thames; this limits the size of boats that can travel past it without having to be removed from the water and replaced upstream of the bridge. Some boats that are able to pass upstream at "low water" may then become trapped as the water level rises.

Whereas some are happy with the restriction: "I would be sorry to see it changed. The river above here is special and I would not want to see boats any larger than those currently using it", many feel that the bridge should be raised to accommodate taller boats. Since the upper reaches of the River Thames will in due course link again with the Gloucester & Sharpness Ship Canal via the Stroudwater Canal and the Thames & Severn Canal (the latter two currently incomplete and in need of restoration), the Osney Bridge would seem an unacceptable obstacle to the growing popularity of canal and river navigation. When the canal link is fully restored, it could substantially relieve the congestion of the Kennet & Avon Canal east-west route, but only if the Osney Bridge is raised.

See also
Crossings of the River Thames
Botley Bridge over Seacourt Stream
Bulstake Bridge over Bulstake Stream

References

Bridges across the River Thames
Bridges in Oxford
Bridges completed in 1889
Road bridges in England